St. Agnes Academy may refer to:
Saint Agnes Academy (Texas) 
St. Agnes' Academy Legazpi City